Ed, Edd n Eddy's Big Picture Show is an animated road comedy television film that serves as the series finale for the animated series Ed, Edd n Eddy. It was produced by a.k.a. Cartoon and premiered on Cartoon Network on November 8, 2009. Series creator Danny Antonucci directed the film and co-wrote it with Jono Howard, Mike Kubat, Rachel Connor and Stacy Warnick. Big Picture Show centers on an adventure that the adolescent Eddy takes his two friends Ed and Edd with him to find his older brother after their most recent money-making scheme leaves their cul-de-sac in a state of devastation that harms its other participants.

Antonucci and a.k.a. Cartoon spent two years working on the film before it was finished in 2008. To focus more on this, he shortened the show's sixth season to two episode segments after getting approval from Cartoon Network to work on a movie. Its title characters are respectively voiced by Matt Hill, Sam Vincent and Tony Sampson while David Paul Grove, Kathleen Barr, Erin Fitzgerald, Peter Kelamis, Janyse Jaud and Keenan Christenson play their neighbors. Terry Klassen, the film's voice director, was cast as Eddy's Brother while Patric Caird composed its score. Ed, Edd n Eddy's Big Picture Show had high ratings for Cartoon Network, posting double and triple digit ratings delivery gains. It has been praised as a strong conclusion for Ed, Edd n Eddy.

Plot
Three adolescent friends named Ed, Edd and Eddy (collectively known as "the Eds") opt to flee the Peach Creek cul-de-sac after their latest money-making scheme heavily backfires and leaves it in a state of devastation. This has severely wounded their neighbors Jonny, Kevin, Nazz and Rolf, who plan to retaliate violently. After narrowly escaping, Eddy decides they should seek protection from his unnamed older brother. Since Eddy does not actually know where he lives, Edd (called Double D) tries to piece together Eddy's inconsistent facts about him to determine a location. To find the Eds, Jonny takes his wooden board Plank with him on a city bus while Rolf rides on his pig, Wilfred, and Kevin and Nazz travel via Kevin's prized bicycle. While Jimmy and Sarah were not involved or affected by the scheme, they seek to have a picnic and watch the Eds get beaten up, but run into the Kanker sisters — Lee, Marie and May. Upon learning about what the other children plan on doing to the Eds from them, the Kankers set out to save them while taking the duo hostage.

Meanwhile, the Eds are left to wander aimlessly under Eddy's direction. In a cow field, Edd profiles Eddy's brother and reasons that given his con artistry, he would likely be found at a place involving pranks. Ed uses one of his decade-old comic books to suggest visiting the Lemon Brook Gag Factory. Upon arriving, they discover the factory has been shut down, and Edd cannot find any clues in the office.

After leaving the factory, Eddy claims his brother was once a whaler, so Edd deduces he must live by the sea. They build a boat and ride on it over the river to find him. The river ends in a swamp, where their boat is destroyed. Ed and Eddy then prank Edd into believing that they have sunken to their demises in quicksand. Infuriated, Edd decides to return home and face the other kids' wrath. Ed sobs over their damaged friendship while Eddy is initially enraged by this. He soon breaks down crying and takes blame for their predicament, prompting Edd to forgive him and the Eds continue their adventure.

Elsewhere, Nazz throws Kevin's bicycle into a tree once she loses patience with him prioritizing it over her well-being while Jimmy and Sarah escape from the Kankers and are joined by Wilfred, who has abandoned Rolf after growing tired of his abrasive attitude. The Kankers abduct Kevin, Nazz and Rolf before the Eds locate a coastal theme park the next morning called "Mondo A-Go Go", which Edd links to a postcard Eddy has from his brother. They conclude that Eddy's brother works there and find his whale-resembling trailer. Everyone else except for Jonny and Plank arrive soon afterwards. Eddy's brother reveals himself and, although he originally seems to be everything that the children imagined, is eventually shown to be physically abusive towards Eddy without reason, leaving everyone appalled. When Edd tries to interfere, Eddy's brother uses his sibling to slam him into the ground, prompting everyone to defend Eddy. Ed soon defeats Eddy's brother by sending his trailer door flying into his face, knocking him out.

Now expressing remorse over his past actions, Eddy tearfully reveals that he lied about his brother in an unsuccessful attempt to gain admiration and social acceptance. Touched by Eddy's confession and eventual apology, the children forgive the Eds and accept them as their friends. Jonny and Plank subsequently arrive and, without giving anyone a chance to explain what happened, quickly attack the Eds. In response, the other kids attack Jonny and Plank. Kevin then invites everyone over for jawbreakers and they return home together while the Kankers drag Eddy's brother into his trailer. Edd concludes the film and the series by putting a label that says "The End" on the screen. In a post-credits scene, Jonny is enraged after everyone turned against him and vows revenge. However, Plank mentions that there is no time left in the film.

Cast

Below is a list of voice actors.

 Matt Hill as Ed, the strong, foolish, non sequitur-emitting member of the Eds and older brother to Sarah.
 Sam Vincent as Edd, the intelligent, hat-wearing, neat-freak, inventor of the Eds.
 Tony Sampson as Eddy, the greedy but self-conscious leader of the Eds.
 David Paul Grove as Jonny, an aloof loner who carries Plank, a wooden board drawn with a smiley face.
 Kathleen Barr as Marie Kanker, the blue-haired Kanker sister, and Kevin, the short-tempered jock and bicycle-rider often at odds with the Eds.
 Erin Fitzgerald as May Kanker, the blonde, dimwitted Kanker sister, and Nazz, an easy-going blonde girl who the Eds, Jonny and Kevin are attracted to.
 Peter Kelamis as Rolf, an immigrant from "the old country" with different customs from the rest of Peach Creek.
 Janyse Jaud as Lee Kanker, the redheaded leader of the Kanker sisters, and Sarah, Ed's spoiled, quick-tempered younger sister.
 Keenan Christensen as Jimmy, an insecure, accident-prone boy who is a close companion of Sarah.
 Terry Klassen as Eddy's Brother, an employee at the Mondo-A-Go Go amusement park who bullies his younger sibling.

Development and release

While Ed, Edd n Eddy was in the middle of its fifth season, Cartoon Network confirmed on March 1, 2006 that a sixth one had been approved. As the show's creator Danny Antonucci and a.k.a. Cartoon were working on season six, the network allowed them to work on a film for it, which would serve as the series finale. He decided to cut the sixth season short so they could focus more on creating this movie, entitled Ed, Edd n Eddy's Big Picture Show. IGN stated that the series was on hiatus in November 2007. The two sixth-season episode segments that had already been produced—"May I Have This Ed" and "Look Before You Ed"—premiered on June 29, 2008. During The Complete Second Season DVD's "Behind the Eds" interview, Antonucci hinted that the film would reveal what is under Double D's hat, though this never occurred. A few episodes, such as "Run Ed, Run", implied that he is bald.

Before Big Picture Show premiered, Antonucci mentioned that it would show Eddy's brother for the first time. The character was voiced by Terry Klassen, who also served as the voice director for Big Picture Show. Antonucci directed the film and co-wrote it along with Jono Howard, Mike Kubat, Rachel Connor and Stacy Warnick. Daniel Sioil as well as Ruth Vincent served as producers while Ken Cathro was its editor and Scott Underwood, Steve Garcia, Raven Molisee, Joel Dickie and "Big" Jim Miller worked on the storyboards. Yeson Entertainment and Voicebox Productions Inc. respectively handled the animation and voice production. Series composer Patric Caird composed the score, and later released this on his website.

On December 1, 2008, Antonucci stated production on the movie was "wrapping up" after two years of work, and that it would air on Cartoon Network the following year. When asked for details about Big Picture Show, he mentioned it would be shown in widescreen format and the title characters would "do something really bad, and they find themselves running away from Cul-De-Sac to find a safe place". After being completed in 2008, the film premiered on November 8, 2009. It runs for a total of 89 minutes. Matt Kapko of Animation World Network described the premiere of Ed, Edd n Eddy's Big Picture Show as a "huge ratings success for Cartoon Network", noting that the premiere "earned double and triple-digit ratings and delivery gains among all kid demo[graphics]".

Reception
Critics have praised Big Picture Show as a strong conclusion to the series. Charlie-Robinson Poortvliet of MovieAddictz.com gave the film an "8.2/10" rating, calling it a "double episode grand finale" that was superior to all previous Ed, Edd n Eddy episodes. Praising the film's plot, voice acting performances and direction, Poortvilet said that he "couldn't stop laughing" and encouraged all fans of the show to see it. Writing for Animated Times, Azhan Ali ranked it at number three on a list of "Most Emotional Endings of Cartoons", and added that the final scene was "heartwarming because the Eds are no longer social outcasts". Collider reviewer Austin Allison named the film as the fourth best among a list of "Top 11 TV Cartoon Movies", deeming it a "surprisingly cathartic" creation that "finally gives the Eds a sense of belonging and acceptance that is more valuable to them than all the jawbreakers in the world." In November 2019, Hayden Adams from UWIRE placed Big Picture Show atop a list of "best kids' TV show endings". Adams stated that it—along with the series finales for Codename: Kids Next Door as well as Phineas and Ferb—"really stuck with me, for the impact the shows had on me and the brilliant endings that were true-to-form in the culmination of each series." Writing for the same publication one year later, John Carter Jr. awarded the movie with a 10 out of 10 rating. He declared it a "perfect" end for the series because of the "finality" and the way Ed, Edd n Eddy "longest-running gags, mysteries, and character relationships" were finished. Carter also called this "the perfect homage to a show about imperfect people" and stated it featured "deep and profound personal experiences that lead to significant growth". When noting how Big Picture Show and the series' three holiday specials were excluded from HBO Max in June 2021, Comic Book Resources contributor Noah Dominguez called the movie's absence "probably the most glaring omission" among the Ed, Edd n Eddy episodes featured for how it was the "true series finale, sending the Eds on an epic journey and completing their character arcs in order to end the show on a high note".

References

External links

 

2009 animated films
2009 films
2009 television films
2000s adventure comedy films
2000s buddy comedy films
2000s children's comedy films
2000s comedy road movies
Canadian adventure comedy films
Canadian animated television films
Canadian comedy road movies
Animated buddy films
Animated films based on animated series
Animated films about friendship
Cartoon Network television films
Ed, Edd n Eddy
English-language Canadian films
Animated films about children
Films directed by Danny Antonucci
Culture of British Columbia
2009 comedy films
Films set in amusement parks
Animated films based on animated television series
2000s Canadian films